Alexander Middleton Speer (1820 – March 28, 1897) was a justice of the Supreme Court of Georgia from 1880 to 1882.

Early life, education, and career
Born in South Carolina, Speer's father, Alexander Speer was "prominent in state affairs". The family moved to Georgia in 1833, and Speer entered the University of Georgia in 1836, graduating in 1839. He read law in the office of Jones & Burnett in Columbus, Georgia, gaining admission to the bar in Georgia in 1840, and practicing in Forsyth, Georgia, and then in Macon, Georgia. In 1853, he became clerk of the Georgia House of Representatives, remaining in that office until 1856.

Military, political, and judicial service
Speer served in the Confederate States Army during the American Civil War, enlisting in the Macon volunteer organization on April 20, 1861, where he was "the eldest member" of the regiment. In 1862, he was elected major of the 46th Georgia Regiment, and then promoted to the rank of lieutenant colonel. He left the military in 1863 and returned to Georgia, where he served in the Georgia State Senate. In 1865, he was appointed judge of the Flint circuit, where he remained until 1868, when he was removed by Governor Rufus Bullock. He then returned to private practice and served in the Georgia House of Representatives for two years before being returned to judicial office. In 1879, he was elected to a seat on the state supreme court vacated by the resignation of Willis Alston Hawkins. Speer remained on the court until 1882.

Personal life and death
Speers had several notable siblings; his older brother Algernon S. Speer became a Florida planter and politician, and his younger brother Eustace Willoughby Speer was a popular minister in the state. Federal judge Emory Speer was his nephew. Speer married Mary Battle in 1841, with whom he had at least four children. Mary died in 1878, and in 1880 Speer married Celesta Broughton Sanders, a widow. Speers died in Madison, Georgia, at the age of 77, following an illness of several months.

References

1820 births
1897 deaths
University of Georgia alumni
U.S. state supreme court judges admitted to the practice of law by reading law
Confederate States Army officers
Members of the Georgia House of Representatives
Justices of the Supreme Court of Georgia (U.S. state)
Georgia (U.S. state) state senators